Bridgewater Place, nicknamed The Dalek, is an office and residential skyscraper in Leeds, West Yorkshire, England. It was the tallest building in Yorkshire at the time of being topped out in September 2005, but is now the second-tallest after another Leeds building, Altus House.

The Building
Bridgewater Place is a large office, retail, and residential mixed-use property completed in April 2007 that sits on a three-acre freehold site in a prime location in central Leeds. At 30 above ground storeys, it was the tallest property in Yorkshire until 2021 with a height of 112m (367 ft) to roof level. Originally, the tower was to have a spire which would have extended the height of the building to 137m (449 ft) but this was never built. It has since been exceeded by Altus House.

The development was designed by Aedas Architects with the developer being Landmark Development Projects and St James Securities with Bovis Lend Lease being the contractor. The developer of the residential element of Bridgewater Place was KW Linfoot.

The Property comprises two separate but inter-connecting structures either side of a central atrium, with 15,587 sq. ft. of retail units on the ground and first floors and 234,711 sq. ft. of commercial office space from floors one to nine. A 20-storey residential tower of 198 apartments sits above the offices on the west wing spanning floors 11 to 30, with floor 10 used to house the mechanical plant. There are two levels of parking offering 268 spaces in the basement and at ground level.

Current office tenants include Eversheds Sutherland (International) LLP, DWF LLP, Ernst & Young LLP, and 2 Plan Limited. Other tenants include Tesco Stores Limited, Gym Factory Leeds City Centre Limited, Soul Coffee House Limited (t/a Starbucks), A.F. Blakemore and Son Limited and Tabeyo Limited t/a Tabeyo.

The completion of the entire building was commemorated on Thursday 26 April 2007. A special episode of Look North, the BBC's local regional news programme was produced to commemorate the opening of the tower. The tower is illuminated at night with bright coloured lighting effects.

The Property benefits from excellent transport links by occupying a high-profile position fronting Victoria Road (the main arterial link between Leeds city centre and the M621 motorway) and close to Leeds

Wind microclimate 

Following the Property reaching practical completion in April 2007, it became apparent that the Property had created an unacceptable wind microclimate, principally to the north of the Property on Water Lane and also at the junction with Water Lane/Neville Street. It was found that the Property was accelerating winds coming from a westerly direction and also creating wind downdraft from the residential tower. One person suffered a torn liver and internal bleeding, and cuts requiring 11 stitches, and a buggy with a three-month-old child was pushed out into the road by a sharp gust. In March 2011, a man was killed by a lorry overturned on him by a gust. The Crown Prosecution Service advised against bringing charges of corporate manslaughter against the architects, Aedas. 

As a result, a wind mitigation scheme (the “Wind Scheme”) was implemented, with construction of the Wind Scheme (comprising a canopy, five screens on the west side of the building and three “baffles” in Water Lane) being completed in August 2018. Leeds City Council put in place a high wind procedure by which part of the Water Lane was closed in high winds. The safety problems caused by the building have affected proposals for other high-rise developments in the city. In August 2016, when submitting plans for Bridge Street, the developers stated that extensive wind tests were being undertaken to avoid 'another Bridgewater Place'. 

Following installation of the Wind Scheme the same 16 locations that were tested before the Wind Scheme was installed were tested on site again. This showed that all test points to the north of the building (the main entrance) passed the Lawson Criteria for frail and elderly people.

Following the completion of the Wind Scheme, based on the on-site wind testing carried out and following review by its own wind expert, RWDI, Leeds City Council lifted the high wind procedure at its executive meeting in October 2019. At the meeting it was noted that no additional complaints about high winds surrounding the Property had been reported since completion of the Wind Scheme.

International Property Securities Exchange (IPSX) 
BWP REIT PLC, a newly formed single asset company established to acquire Bridgewater Place announced in November 2022 that the Company had raised £35,000,000 from the issue of 35,000,000 new ordinary shares with a nominal value of 10 pence each at an issue price of 100 pence per share.

The entire issued ordinary share capital of the Company was admitted to trading on the Wholesale segment of the International Property Securities Exchange (“IPSX”) with the new Ordinary Shares representing c. 99.9 per cent. of the issued ordinary share capital on Admission. Admission and dealings commenced at 9.00 am on 16 November 2022.

In connection with the application for Admission, the Company prepared an admission document which has been published and is available at www.bwpreit.com

The capital has been raised from a number of institutional and family office investors. Upon Admission M7 Real Estate Ltd (“M7” and together with its subsidiaries, the “M7 Group”), either directly or through its affiliates, will own c.18.4% of the Company’s share capital.

The Ordinary Shares will trade under the ticker ‘BWP’. The ISIN number of the Ordinary Shares is GB00BQ1NFW69 and the SEDOL code is BQ1NFW6.WH Ireland Limited (“WH Ireland”) acted as IPSX Lead Adviser and Settlement Agent.

On Admission, BWP REIT became the third company to be admitted to trading on IPSX. The platform is a FCA Regulated Investment Exchange and the world’s first such exchange dedicated to single asset real estate companies and those owning multiple assets with commonality. IPSX Wholesale is reserved for institutional and qualified professional investors, while the IPSX Prime segment of the market is open to all investors and aims to give retail investors the ability to acquire tradable shares in institutional quality real estate assets.

Gallery

See also
List of tallest buildings in Leeds
Architecture of Leeds

Notes

External links

Aedas Official Website
 Views of and from Bridgewater Place on Lovin' Leeds
Skyscraper News article on Bridgewater Place
Bridgewater Place page on Leeds Cityscape
Website of artists making atrium sculpture
BBC Article on the completion of Bridgewater Place
BBC News broadcast covering the sculpture
Local newspaper covering wind deflection work
 PDF floor plans of some of the residential parts of the building

Skyscrapers in Leeds
Residential skyscrapers in England
Buildings and structures completed in 2007
Skyscraper office buildings in England